Synizesis refers to a phenomenon sometimes observed in one of the subphases of meiosis. This phenomenon, sometimes referred to as a "synizetic knot", and contrasted with the chromosome "bouquet" more typically observed, is characterized by the localization of the meiotic chromosomes in a tight clump on one side of the nucleus. The term synizesis seems to have been coined by McClung in 1905.

The synizetic knot (Synizesis) was later found to be a technical artifact induced by the feature of strong acidic fixatives used during that time (e.g., Flemming's strong fixative) to precipitate the thread-like delicate chromosomes of the Leptotene stage of first meiotic prophase into a dark staining knot.

References

Cellular processes